FFSA may refer to:

Football Federation South Australia
Fédération Française du Sport Automobile